Harvey Putnam (January 5, 1793 – September 20, 1855) was an American lawyer and politician. He was a Whig member of the U.S. House of Representatives, and served in the New York Senate.

Early life
Putnam was born in Brattleboro, Windham County, Vermont, the youngest of nine children of Asa Putnam and Anna (Collins) Putnam. His father died while he was an infant, and he went with his mother to live with relatives in Williamstown, Massachusetts, and later with relatives in Cobleskill, New York.

He attended the common schools and studied law in Skaneateles, New York, supporting himself by teaching. In 1816, he was admitted to the bar and began the practice of law in Attica, New York in 1817.

Political career
He became involved in politics and held several offices in Attica, He was elected as a Whig to the 25th United States Congress, to fill the vacancy caused by the death of William Patterson, holding office from November 7, 1838, to March 3, 1839.

Putnam was appointed as Surrogate of Genesee County in 1840, an office he held until the division of the county. He was then appointed as Surrogate of Wyoming County, remaining in office until 1843.

He was a member of the New York State Senate (Eight District) from 1843 to 1846, sitting in the 66th, 67th, 68th and 69th Legislatures.

He was elected as a Whig to the 30th and 31st United States Congresses, holding office from March 4, 1847, to March 3, 1851. After leaving Congress, he resumed the practice of law.

Putnam died on September 20, 1855 in Attica, and is interred in Forest Hill Cemetery in Attica.

Family life
Putnam married Myra Osborne of Skaneateles, New York, on August 5, 1817. Their son was James O. Putnam, New York State Senator and U.S. Minister to Belgium.

References

External links
 

	

1793 births
1855 deaths
People from Brattleboro, Vermont
Whig Party members of the United States House of Representatives from New York (state)
19th-century American politicians
New York (state) state senators
People from Wyoming County, New York
New York (state) lawyers
People from Genesee County, New York
People from Williamstown, Massachusetts
People from Cobleskill, New York
19th-century American lawyers